Wheat Exports Australia (WEA) was an Australian government agency that regulated the export of bulk wheat through the bulk Wheat Export Accreditation Scheme ("the Scheme"). The Wheat Export Marketing Amendment Act 2012 was passed by parliament on 29 November 2012, abolishing Wheat Exports Australia

The WEA was established on 1 July 2008 under the Wheat Export Marketing Act 2008 ("the Act"). 
It succeeded the Export Wheat Commission.

References

External links
 Archived website http://wayback.archive-it.org/3413/20121204151214/http://www.wea.gov.au/
 
 Wheat Export Marketing Act 2008
 Wheat Export Accreditation Scheme 2008
 ACCC - Port Terminal Access Undertakings
 Productivity Commission Report on Australia's Wheat Export Marketing Arrangements 2010
 Wheat Export Marketing Amendment Bill 2012
 House of Representatives - Wheat Export Marketing Amendment Bill 2012
 Department of Agriculture Fisheries and Forestry - Wheat

Defunct government entities of Australia
2012 disestablishments in Australia
Organizations disestablished in 2012
Grain industry of Australia
Foreign trade of Australia
Export